The Athens News (stylized as NEWS) is an American free weekly, English-language newspaper published in Athens, Ohio. It was founded in 1977, and serves the area that contains Ohio University. It was initial published weekly under the name Athena "A" News but was published every Monday and Thursday since 1982 before becoming a weekly paper in 2019. Today, it publishes every Wednesday. It is one of three newspapers in Athens County, alongside The Athens Messenger and Ohio University's The Post. In the fall of 2014, the News was acquired by Adams Publishing Group, who had acquired the Messenger earlier that year. Corinne Colbert currently serves as editor of the publication and Cole Behrens serves as Associate Editor.

The Athens NEWS was founded in 1977 as an alternative publication to the local media environment, which included The Athens Messenger and The OU Post — but in the 1980s The Athens NEWS became a staple for local news in Athens due to its focus on the city and investigative content. The Athens NEWS recently celebrated its 40th anniversary in 2017 and commemorated the occasion by publishing a book "40 Years on the Bricks: A History of The Athens NEWS."

Microfilmed issues of the Athens News issues from 1977 to 1990 and paper issues from 2000 to present are located at the Ohio University Alden Library Annex.

History
 Athens "A" News ([Athens, Ohio]) 1977-1978, 
 The Athens News (Athens, Ohio) 1979-current,

References

Newspapers published in Ohio
Mass media in Athens, Ohio
1977 establishments in Ohio